Ranops is a genus of spiders in the family Zodariidae. It was first described in 1991 by Jocqué. , it contains 5 species from Africa.

Species
 R. caprivi Jocqué, 1991 (type) — Namibia, Zimbabwe
 R. dippenaarae Russell-Smith & Jocqué, 2015 — Tanzania
 R. robinae Jocqué & Henrard, 2020 — South Africa
 R. tharinae Jocqué & Henrard, 2020 — Botswana
 R. wandae Jocqué & Henrard, 2020 — Namibia

References

Zodariidae
Araneomorphae genera
Spiders of Asia
Spiders of Africa